AHMCT is the Advanced Highway Maintenance and Construction Technology Research Center. It is located on the University of California Davis campus in Davis, California. They perform transportation related research in highway maintenance, transportation infrastructure, structures, and roadways. They are funded through public and private research grants.

External links
Web site, Advanced Highway Maintenance and Construction Technology Research Center
Location, Advanced Highway Maintenance and Construction Technology Research Center
ATIRC location, Advanced Highway Maintenance and Construction Technology Research Center

University of California, Davis
Transportation engineering
Research institutes in California